The 2008 Macau Grand Prix (formally the 55th Windsor Arch Macau Grand Prix) was a motor race for Formula Three cars that was held on the streets of Macau on 16 November 2008. Unlike other races, such as the Masters of Formula 3, the 2008 Macau Grand Prix was not a part of any Formula Three championship, but was open to entries from all Formula Three championships. The race itself was made up of two races: a ten-lap qualifying race that decided the starting grid for the fifteen-lap main race. The 2008 race was the 55th running of the Macau Grand Prix and the 26th for Formula Three cars.

The Grand Prix was won by TOM'S driver Keisuke Kunimoto on his maiden appearance in Macau, having finished second in the previous day's Qualification Race that was won by Signature-Plus driver Edoardo Mortara. Kunimoto led from the start of the race and held it throughout to become the first Japanese driver to win in Macau since Takuma Sato won the 2001 race and it was the second consecutive victory for TOM'S in the Grand Prix. Second place went to Mortara, while the podium was completed by Carlin driver Brendon Hartley.

Background and entry list

The Macau Grand Prix is a Formula Three race considered to be a stepping stone to higher motor racing categories such as Formula One and has been termed the territory's most prestigious international sporting event. The 2008 Macau Grand Prix was the 55th running of the event and the 26th time the race was held to Formula Three regulations. It took place on the  22-turn Guia Circuit on 16 November 2008 with three preceding days of practice and qualifying.

In order to compete in Macau, drivers had to compete in a Fédération Internationale de l'Automobile (FIA)-regulated championship meeting during the calendar year, in either the FIA Formula 3 International Trophy or one of the domestic championships, with the highest-placed drivers given priority in receiving an invitation to the race. Within the 30-car grid of the event, two of the four major Formula Three series were represented by their respective champion. Nico Hülkenberg, the Formula Three Euro Series champion, was required to miss the race because of him partaking in a GP2 Series test session at the Circuit Paul Ricard. Thus, the highest placed Formula Three Euro Series competitor at Macau was Edoardo Mortara and he was joined by British champion Jaime Alguersuari and Japanese series winner Carlo van Dam. The top performing driver to of the German championship was Laurens Vanthoor, and the Australian Drivers' Championship winner James Winslow accepted an invitation by race organisers to race in Macau. Three drivers from outside of Formula Three took part in the race: Eurocup Formula Renault 2.0 racer Roberto Merhi, Roberto Streit of Formula Nippon and Formula V6 Asia driver Michael Ho.

Practice and qualifying

There were two half an hour practice sessions preceding the Sunday race: one on Thursday morning and one on Friday morning. Mortara lapped quickest for Signature-Plus in the opening practice session at 2 minutes, 14.333 seconds late on, seven-tenths of a second faster than any one else on the circuit in spite of making a minor error on the lap. His closest challenger was Renger van der Zande in second position. Streit, Van Dam, James Jakes, Stefano Coletti, Alguersuari, Merhi and the British duo of Jon Lancaster and Sam Bird rounded out the session's top ten drivers. During the session, where the top of the time sheets was shared by multiple drivers, Brendon Hartley missed the second half because of a gearbox problem. Red-flags were necessitated before the session's half-way point when Mika Mäki crashed heavily at Fisherman's Bend. Kazuya Oshima and Walter Grubmüller went into the wall at Maternity Bend separately. Mäki was transported to the circuit's medical centre to undergo precautionary checks after complaining of abdomen pains and was advised to rest.

Qualifying was divided into two 45-minute sessions: on Thursday afternoon, and the second on Friday afternoon. The fastest time set by each driver from either session counted towards his final starting position for the qualification race. The first qualifying session, held in warm and sunny weather, had Mortara go fastest with a time of 2 minutes, 12.416 seconds and led throughout. Van Dam was three-tenths of a second slower than Mortara and took second. Streit twice held second but ended qualifying third. Hartley recovered from his gearbox problems earlier in the day to run strongly for provisional fourth. Van Der Zande was consistent and ended fifth. He was followed by the highest-placed rookie Alguersuari in sixth and Bird in seventh. Jules Bianchi and his teammate Jakes were eighth and tenth; the duo were separated by Oliver Turvey. Marcus Ericsson was the fastest driver not to reach the top ten despite running as high as sixth in first qualifying's opening minutes. Following him were Keisuke Kunimoto, Kei Cozzolino, Coletti, the Hitech Racing duo of Max Chilton and Merhi, Winslow, Grubmüller, Oshima and Daniel Campos-Hull, Laurens Vanthoor, Atte Mustonen, Basil Shaaban, Cheng Congfu, Lancaster, Masaki Matsushita, Ho and Nicola de Marco. The only driver to go under the minimum qualification time was Koki Saga. The session was stopped three times: Jakes' car got unsettled on the tarmac entering Fisherman's Bend on a faster lap and hit the outside barriers, littering the track with debris. De Marco struck the Fisherman's Bend barriers and angled across the circuit. Matsushita spun towards the track's centre after hitting the barriers at Police corner with one minute left. Mortara and Vanthoor could not avoid his stranded car and piled into it. For ignoring the red light signal which mandated he enter the weighbridge, Matsushita was summoned to the stewards and they ordered him to start at the rear of the grid for the qualification race.

Mäki returned to the circuit on the morning of the second 30-minute practice session and was declared fit to compete. He revealed that he had been suffering from food poisoning that worsened while driving and combated this by sleeping heavily the previous day. The start was delayed by 50 minutes due to multiple crashes in practice for the touring car support races. Mortara primarily focused on race setup and was fatest with a benchmark time of 2 minutes, 13.054 seconds by slipstreaming another car into Mandarin Bend. Van Dam was 0.117 seconds slower in second and was a full second faster than Cozzolino in third. Alguersuari,  Turvey,  Merhi, Hartley, Ericsson, Van Der Zande ninth and Streit were in positions four to ten. De Marco spun at Fisherman's Bend, stopping practice as he was adjudged to be in a dangerous place. Alguersuari damaged the left-hand side of his car and removed his rear wing in an impact with the San Francisco End barriers which halted the session for a second time. The two other incidents during the session were Mäki suffering a puncture and spending most of his time in the pit lane and Van Dam braked late for Lisboa corner and stopped on the escape road.

In the second qualifying session, Van Dam bettered Mortara's lap from first qualifying until Mustonen went off the track at Police corner and the yellow flags were waved. Halfway through the session, drivers who had new tyres available had them fitted and adjusted their cars. Shortly after, Matsushita crashed near Police turn and his car was removed from the track. Mortara then regained provisional pole, until the session was stopped when Bianchi ran wide exiting the Reservoir Bend and hit the tyre barriers at the end of the turn. His left rear wheel flew onto the track's centre. Bird became the first driver to go below 2 minutes, 11 seconds all weekend, before red flags were needed for Cozzolino whose heavy crash at Fisherman's Bend left debris on the track. At the restart, Van Dam slightly deranged his steering arm but used a clear track to go faster than Bird and secure pole position with a lap of 2 minutes, 11.846 seconds. This demoted Bird to second having been delayed by a slow-moving Grubmüller. Kunimoto used the slipstream of another car to take third, while the previous day's provisional pole sitter Mortara was fourth. Streit dropped two positions to fifth and Merhi moved up nine to start from sixth. Van Der Zande in seventh chose not to slipstream other cars to avoid being delayed in the track's tight section. Turvey was as high as third but was eighth with Alguersuari ninth and Jakes tenth. The rest of the field lined up as Hartley, Coletti (who crashed at Police turn and blocked the track), Chilton, Mäki, Ericsson, Oshimi, Bianchi, Cozzolino, Grubmüller, Cheng, Campos-Hull, Winslow, Lancaster, Shabban, Saga, Mustonen, Vanthoor (who set no lap time as he crashed on his out-lap), Matsushita, Ho and De Marco. After qualifying, Bird was demoted three places on the grid for missing a signal to enter the weighbridge during second practice.

Qualifying classification
Each of the driver's fastest lap times from the two qualifying sessions are denoted in bold.

Notes:
  – Sam Bird was penalised three places on the grid because of him ignoring a signal to enter the weighbridge during the second practice session.
  – Masaki Matsushita was sent to the rear of the grid because of him ignoring a signal to enter the weighbridge during the first qualifying session.

Qualifying race

The qualifying race to set the grid order for the main race started at 13:45 Macau Standard Time (UTC+08:00) on 15 November. On the grid, Van Dam was slow to get going and Kunimoto overtook him for the lead. Van Dam attempted to reclaim the first position from Kunimoto but ran wide and punctured his left-rear tyre from contact with the barriers through Mandarin corner. Mortara then unsuccessfully attempted to overtake Kunimoto and the duo narrowly avoided making contact. Four more cars overtook Van Dam into Lisboa turn, and he later tangled with fellow countryman Van Der Zande at San Francisco Bend. The two drivers' races ended early as a consequence of the contact. Merhi stalled on the grid and ceded several positions. Further down the field on the second lap, Jakes and Hartley glanced each other against the wall heading towards the Reservoir Bend. Jakes moved across the front of Hartley's car and into the wall. Hartley entered the pit lane with suspension damage while Jakes retired.

A multi-car collision was triggered at Lisboa turn when Bianchi spun entering the corner. He caused a chain reaction involving the trio of Hitech cars of Grubmüller, Chilton and Merhi. Bianchi's spin caused a secondary accident that started when Shaaban went into the rear of his teammate Campos-Hull and was spun into Cheng. The two drivers squeezed Mustonen into the barriers lining the track. While Merhi and Grubmüller rejoined, Chilton, Bianchi, Cheng and Mustonen retired. Since several cars were in the opposite direction and beached on the kerbs, the safety car was deployed so the wreckage could be cleared by marshals. Merhi made a pit stop and Oshima retired. The safety car remained on track for three laps and Kunimoto led the field back up to speed at the restart with Mortara in second. Shaaban set the fastest lap earlier in the race but retired after crashing at Reservoir turn. In his attempt to claim the lead, Mortara began to attack Kunimoto but Kunimoto resisted him. Streit was close behind the two drivers and defended from Turvey who was distracted by Bird, who in turn, battled Alguersuari.

At the race's halfway point, Ho lost control of his car at Police corner but did not create a traffic jam as only Matsushita was behind him and got past without any trouble. Mortara clung onto Kunimoto's slipstream and then steered left onto the outside line, to brake later than him for the lead at the start of the seventh lap. Mortara started to pull away from Kunimoto while Streit began drawing closer to the latter but was observing Turvey behind him. On the ninth lap, Mäki damaged his car at the Reservoir Bend and debris was littered on the track. He continued driving despite a rear puncture and a detached rear wing and went off the track twice. Mortara kept the lead for the rest of the race to win pole position for the Grand Prix itself. He was joined on the grid's front row by Kunimoto and Streit completed the podium. Turvey followed in fourth with Bird fifth and Alguersuari sixth. Coletti, Ericsson, Campos-Hull and Cozzolino, Winslow, Vanthoor, Lancaster, Saga, Grubmüller, Mäki, Merhi, Matushita, De Marco and Hartley rounded out the 20 classified finishers.

Qualification Race classification

Warm-up
A 20-minute warm-up session was held on the morning of the main race. Hartley ran more strongly than he had done any of the previous sessions and topped the time sheets with a new fastest lap of the weekend of 2 minutes, 11.071 seconds. He was six-tenths of a second faster than his nearest challenger Van Dam in second with Coletti third. Ericsson was fourth ahead of Bird in fifth and the qualification race winner Mortara placed sixth. Cozzolino, Streit, Alguersuari and Campos-Hull followed in the time sheets to round out the top ten fastest drivers.

Main race

The race began on 16 November at 15:30 local time. When the Grand Prix started, Kunimoto accelerated faster than Mortara off the line and was ahead of him heading towards Lisboa corner. Turvey stalled and created confusion as drivers swerved to avoid hitting his car. Vanthoor yielded six places as his clutch slipped but avoided stalling his engine. Streit defended against Bird into Mandarin Bend and they collided. Streit's car went across Bird's and drifted into the right-band barriers. He heavily damaged his car entering the corner before rebounding off the wall and veering left. Soon after, Ericsson went off the track entering Lisboa corner and several cars piled up behind him or had to negotiate their way past his stricken vehicle. The safety car was immediately deployed to control the race by picking up Kunimoto. The wreckage was cleared in two laps and Kunimoto held onto the lead at the restart and was followed by Mortara. Saga became the race's fourth retirement when he hit the wall at Lisboa corner. Just as Mortara locked his brakes on the bumpy track, Campos-Hull slipstreamed onto the back of Alguersuari heading towards Lisboa turn and overtook him for third position.

Mortara's brake locking dropped him to fourth behind Campos-Hull and Alguersuari. Meanwhile, Kunimoto started to pull away from the rest of the field. Alguersuari got back past Campos-Hull for second on the fifth lap and Mortara overtook the latter for third on the next lap. As he began to reduce the time deficit to Kunimoto, Alguersuari's chances of winning were diminished when he was deemed to have jumped the start and was told he would incur a drive-through penalty. Alguersuari took his penalty at the end of lap five and Mortara began reducing Kunimoto's lead of 2½ seconds. As the race appeared to settle into calmness, Matsushita went into the wall after leaving the Mandarin Bend and temporarily blocked the track. Winslow drifted off the circuit at Police turn and hit the wall. Lancaster relinquished sixth place to Hartley while Mäki was now in the top ten. The safety car was called to neutralise the race on lap eight when Merhi spun at Reservoir Bend and heavily damaged his car. The incident caught the recovering Van Dam off guard who clipped debris and crashed. Kunimoto's lead had now evaporated and he was followed by Mortara, Campos-Hull, Cozzolino and Hartley.

The race restarted on the tenth lap and Kunimoto held the lead. Mortara could not hang on to Kunimoto because of the former's higher straightline speed. In his effort to remain with Kunimoto, Mortara ran wide at Matsuya corner and bent his right-front suspension from contact with the wall, and Campos-Hull challenged him. Further back, Mäki was fending off Van Der Zande as the latter tried to pass him for sixth. Shabban was another retiree when he went off the circuit and into the barriers at Lisboa corner. Turvey recovered to move into the top ten while his teammate Hartley remained in fifth so he could observe any mistakes from Mortara, Campos-Hull and Cozzolino. Although Coletti drifted off the track and returned, he later hit the barriers at Hospital corner and was the race's final retirement. On the 13th lap, Cozzolino tried to overtake Campos-Hull but struck the rear of the latter's car braking for Lisboa corner and dropped out of the top ten. The crash promoted Hartley into third. Hartley and Turvey traded the fastest lap until Hartley claimed it on the final lap by completing a circuit in 2 minutes, 12.565 seconds.

Turvey passed Grubmüller to claim seventh on the final lap. On his maiden appearance in Macau, it was Kunimoto's victory, achieving the first win for a Japanese driver in Macau since Takuma Sato won the 2001 race, and it was the second consecutive Macau Grand Prix victory for TOM'S. Mortara finished 1.710 seconds later in second and Hartley moved up 17 places from his starting position to complete the podium in third. Off the podium, Mäki finished in fourth place ahead of Van Der Zande in fifth, both having been distanced by the lead group during the race. Vanthoor took sixth place, having started thirteenth, and was narrowly ahead of the seventh-placed Turvey. The top ten was completed by Grubmüller, Bianchi and Alguersuari. Outside the top ten, Lancaster finished eleventh, having progressed two from his starting position. Jakes Cheng, Chilton. Cozzolino, Oshima, Campos-Hull, Mustonen, De Marco and Ho were the final classified finishers.

Main Race classification

References

External links

 

Macau
Macau Grand Prix
Macau Grand Prix
Macau Grand Prix Formula Three